The Aztec Main Street Historic District is a  historic district which was listed on the National Register of Historic Places in 1985.  It included 11 buildings, eight of them being contributing buildings.  The district is a half-block area bounded by Main E., Chuska S., alley between Park and Main W., and Chaco N.

It includes:
J. M. Randall Building (1907), 117 S. Main, Italianate brick building
Townsend Building (1908-1913), 111 S. Main
Odd Fellows Lodge Building, 109 S. Main

References

National Register of Historic Places in New Mexico
Italianate architecture in New Mexico
Neoclassical architecture in New Mexico
San Juan County, New Mexico
Historic districts on the National Register of Historic Places in New Mexico